Moussa Savadogo (born 8 April 1959) is a Malian sprinter. He competed in the men's 200 metres at the 1984 Summer Olympics.

References

External links
 

1959 births
Living people
Athletes (track and field) at the 1984 Summer Olympics
Malian male sprinters
Olympic athletes of Mali
World Athletics Championships athletes for Mali
Place of birth missing (living people)
21st-century Malian people